Narasingapuram may refer to any of the following places in India:

 Narasingapuram, Gummidipoondi, Tiruvalluvar district, Tamil Nadu
 Narasingapuram, Papanasam taluk, Thanjavur district, Tamil Nadu
 Narasingapuram, Pattukkottai taluk, Thanjavur district, Tamil Nadu
 Narasingapuram, Salem, Tamil Nadu
 Narasingapuram, Vellore, Tamil Nadu